D. intermedia  may refer to:
 Dactylopteryx intermedia, a praying mantis species
 Danthonia intermedia, the timber oatgrass or intermediate oatgrass, a grass species native to North America
 Dicranomyia intermedia, a crane fly species in the genus Dicranomyia 
 Drosera intermedia, the oblong-leaved sundew or spoonleaf sundew, an insectivorous plant species found in Europe, southeastern Canada, the eastern half of the United States, Cuba and northern South America
 Dryopteris intermedia, the intermediate wood fern, an evergreen fern species found in eastern North American
 Dypsis intermedia, a flowering plant species found only in Madagascar

See also
 Intermedia (disambiguation)